The Women of Discovery Awards are given by the non-profit WINGS WorldQuest, in recognition of the achievements of women in science and exploration. 
The awards were first presented in 2003, the same year that WINGS WorldQuest was formed by Milbry Polk and Leila Hadley Luce. 
Both the Board of Directors and a Junior Council at the granting organization, WINGS WorldQuest, are involved in selecting the recipients of the Women of Discovery Awards, who are thereafter known as Fellows. 

 

Women of Discovery Awards are given in the categories of Lifetime Achievement, Air and Space, Conservation, Courage, Earth, Field Research, Film and Exploration, Humanity, Leadership, and the Sea.  In addition, some recipients have been simply designated as "Fellows", without being placed in a category. The awards include an unrestricted financial grant. 
In addition to its fellowship program, WINGS WorldQuest  offers Flag Carrier grants in support of field researchers who are financing explorations.

Fellows 
The awards are given every 1-2 years. Not all awards are given each year. In some years more the same award may be given to more than one person.

Lifetime Achievement

Air and Space

Conservation

Courage

Earth

Field Research

Film and Exploration

Humanity

Innovation in Technology Award

Leadership

Sea

Fellow

Flag Carriers  
WINGS WorldQuest Flag Carriers receive grants in support of field research to help finance explorations.

References

Science awards honoring women
Awards established in 2003